The Wave is a 2019 American film science fiction thriller film directed by Gille Klabin distributed by Epic Pictures.

Plot
Frank, an insurance lawyer, finds disqualifying information in the $4M insurance policy of a fireman who died from a heart attack. His co-worker Jeff invites him to celebrate the night before his presentation to the company board, which he eventually accepts after a tense evening with his wife.

The two men visit club El Madrid where Frank briefly meets a homeless man bathing in the bathroom sink. Frank and Jeff share drinks with two women, Natalie and Theresa, and the four of them go to a house party where Frank and Theresa are offered a hallucinogen by a man named Aeolus.

Theresa administers the drug to Frank with a kiss, causing him to instantly black out and wake up alone the next morning. As Frank attempts to make sense of his situation and find his wallet, a family enters the house and calls the police on him, as he runs out the back door. Frank makes it back to his house without any money by convincing a passing cab driver to take him home for a much larger fare. At home, he argues with his wife Cheryl about the smell of perfume on his shirt as he hastily dresses for work.

Upon slamming a bedroom door to protect himself from an alarm clock thrown by Cheryl, Frank discovers he's been transported to his office, where he is greeted by Jeff and escorted to the board meeting. Frank presents the insurance claim information to a happy board, but is immediately met with disturbing visions of the board reacting demonically to the $4M policy denial. He goes to the bathroom to throw up, and agrees with Jeff that he is likely still high.

Cheryl calls him and chews him out because all of their accounts have been emptied. Frank's boss tells Jeff to take him home but the pair instead go back to the club in an attempt to find Aeolus (and Frank's wallet). The bartender who served them doesn't start their shift until later, so the two decide to wait till then to find out information on the girls they were with. While Jeff naps, Frank discovers he can't charge his phone in Jeff's car and slaps the dash in frustration, suddenly turning the day to night.

At night, Natalie shows up and the men team up with her as she says she knows the drug dealer that was working the party. The trio attempt to leave in Jeff's car but it does not start. While waiting for the car to move, Frank witnesses an accident and goes to help, but his consciousness is teleported away just as he's hit by another car. He finds himself next to Theresa in an ethereal field, where they talk about looking for each other. Quickly afterwards, he is teleported back into Jeff's car as it stops in front of the dealer's house.

Inside the residence, the trio find out the guy Natalie knew, Richie, is not Aeolus. They go to leave, but Richie notices Frank is tripping, and offers him a multitude of drugs that could bring him down. Frank agrees while the others go to the car, and then starts hallucinating as Richie is asking him about the drug he took. In his confused state, Frank grabs and consumes as many of Richie's drugs as he can. He immediately blasts away to a mythical place, where Theresa explains that the universe is always trying to achieve balance.

Frank snaps back to reality inside the car with Jeff and Natalie as they are being shot at by Richie and his guard Lamont for stealing the drugs. Richie takes them back to his place where Lamont ties up Jeff and Natalie and beats Frank. Frank calls Cheryl to get money from her parents but she hangs up. Fed up, Richie is about to shoot Natalie when Frank slams his phone on the floor and snaps back to the party the previous night. He immediately finds Aeolus and sits down with him, also discovering his wallet. After talking with Aeolus, Frank transports to outside the club the next afternoon and makes a deal with the homeless man. He then transports back to Richie's, where the homeless man from El Madrid shows up with $240,000 in cash from Frank's bank accounts and a new mortgage on his house. Richie and Lamont are in shock - Frank has done all this by traveling in time - but they accept the money anyway and release the trio.

Jeff drives Natalie back to El Madrid where they find Theresa, who is now a completely different person. Frank is transported to the previous day at work where he is asked to fill out paperwork for a $4M life insurance policy attached to his promotion. Finally realizing the universe's message, he makes the fireman's widow the beneficiary of his policy. His boss sees the policy before Frank is able to mail it and threatens to fire him if he does not change it. Frank disregards the threat and time travels again, this time back to the accident outside of the El Madrid club the night before. He walks towards it to help and is hit by the intoxicated driver from before, who is actually his boss. When the police arrive on the scene, they find Richie's drugs in the trunk of his car.

Though Frank ends up deceased on the hood of the car, his consciousness wakes up lying next to the original Theresa again.

Cast
Tommy Flanagan as Aeolus
Justin Long as Frank
Sheila Vand as Theresa
Donald Faison as Jeff
Katia Winter as Natalie
Bill Sage as Jonas
Sarah Minnich as Cheryl
Ronnie Gene Blevins as Ritchie
Carl W. Lucas as Big Jesus

Critical reception
The film received mixed to positive reviews from critics. The website's critics consensus reads: "Much like its addled protagonist, The Wave struggles to stay on target, but Justin Long's performance helps this pleasantly offbeat sci-fi fantasy find its way."

References

External links
 

2019 films
2010s English-language films
American science fiction thriller films
2010s American films